Overcoat Glacier is in the  U.S. state of Washington. Overcoat Glacier is in both Wenatchee and Snoqualmie National Forests and flows north from Overcoat Peak and Chimney Rock.

See also
List of glaciers in the United States

References

Glaciers of the North Cascades
Glaciers of King County, Washington
Landforms of Kittitas County, Washington
Glaciers of Washington (state)